The 2017–18 Nicholls State Colonels women's basketball team represented Nicholls State University during the 2017–18 NCAA Division I women's basketball season. The Colonels, led by tenth year head coach DoBee Plaisance, played their home games at Stopher Gym and were members of the Southland Conference. They finished the season 19–13, 11–7 in Southland play to finish in a three-way tie for fourth place. They won their first Southland women's tournament and earns an automatic trip to their first NCAA women's tournament in school history where they lost in the first round to Mississippi State.

Previous season
The Colonels finished the season 10–20 overall and 7–11 in Southland play a three-way tie for eighth place. They lost in the first round of the Southland women's tournament to McNeese State.

Roster
Sources:

Schedule
Sources:

|-
!colspan=12 style=";"| Non-conference regular season

|-
!colspan=12 style=";"| Southland regular season

|-
!colspan=12 style=";"| Southland Women's Tournament

|-
!colspan=12 style=";"| Southland Women's Tournament

Rankings
2017–18 NCAA Division I women's basketball rankings

See also
2017–18 Nicholls State Colonels men's basketball team

References

Nicholls Colonels women's basketball seasons
Nicholls State
Nicholls
Nicholls
Nicholls